Karen Leigh Christman is an American bioengineer who is the Associate Dean for Faculty Affairs and the Pierre Galletti Endowed Chair for Bioengineering Innovation at University of California, San Diego. Her research considers regenerative medicine and tissue engineering. She was elected a Fellow of the National Academy of Inventors in 2023.

Early life and education 
Christman studied biomedical engineering at Northwestern University. She moved to California in 2000, where she earned her graduate degrees. Christman was a doctoral researcher at the University of California, San Francisco (USCF), where she developed in situ approaches for myocardial tissue engineering. She has said that she started working in biengineering to find a way to help patients.

Research and career 
After her PhD, she moved to the University of California, Los Angeles for postdoctoral research, working with Heather Maynard on polymer chemistry to develop new strategies for site-specific patterning of proteins.
In 2007, Christman joined the Department of Bioengineering at UCSF. She develops materials for tissue engineering and regenerative medicine. Her research considers naturally-occurring and synthetically derived hydrogels to repair and regenerate tissue. She looks to use these hydrogels for non-invasive therapeutic interventions. In particular, Christman has studied myocardial infarction, which is a leading cause of death worldwide and from which many people do not recover full function.

In 2017, Christman was one of the most highly funded researchers at UCSF, receiving a large grant from the California Institute for Regenerative Medicine to study peripheral artery disease. vShe is the founder of Ventrix, Inc, which looks to create a new class of biotherapeutics that help the extracellular matrix guide the body to generate healthy tissue.

Christman serves as editor-in-chief of NPG Regenerative Medicine.

Awards and honors 
 NIH Director's New Innovator and Transformative Research Awards
 Tissue Engineering and Regenerative Medicine Society Young Investigator Award
 Tissue Engineering and Regenerative Medicine Society Senior Scientist Award
 Fellow of the American Institute for Medical and Biological Engineering
 Fellow of the National Academy of Inventors

Selected publications 
Her publications include:

References 

Year of birth missing (living people)
Living people
American bioengineers
Women bioengineers
21st-century American biologists
21st-century American engineers
21st-century American women scientists
21st-century women engineers
Northwestern University alumni
University of California, San Francisco staff
University of California, Los Angeles staff
University of California, San Francisco faculty
Fellows of the American Institute for Medical and Biological Engineering
Fellows of the National Academy of Inventors